Dreschhoff Peak in Antarctica is named after Gisela A.M. Dreschhoff, a physicist at the Space Technology Center, University of Kansas, who conducted radioactivity surveys and other field work in various parts of Antarctica, including Victoria Land, for 11 field seasons, 1976–89.

References 

Mountains of Victoria Land
Scott Coast